WCMD may refer to:

 Wind Corrected Munitions Dispenser
 WCMD (AM), a radio station (1230 AM) licensed to Cumberland, Maryland, United States
 WCMD-FM, a radio station (89.9 FM) licensed to Barre, Vermont, United States